The following is a list of episodes for the Nickelodeon/YTV animated television series Mysticons. The series was picked up for 40 episodes, which have aired over two seasons.

Series overview

Episodes

Season 1 (2017)
The second generation of legendary heroes is chosen by the all-powerful, ancient Dragon Disk as were the original four Mysticons, one thousand years ago.
Princess Arkayna's mother, Queen Goodfey, had remarried a man named Darius, who is king consort and has a self-centered teenage son named Gawayne, who becomes acting king when his father and stepmother become bone statues.
The special power of the human Mysticon Dragon Mage and the elven Mysticon Striker are revealed to be telekinesis and glittery, bright yellow fairy dust called her Pixie Blast attack.
The leader of the original four Mysticons is revealed to have been Imani Firewing, who had ultimately defeated Queen Necrafa, at the cost of her own life. The original Mysticons Ranger and dwarven Knight were teenage guys and remain unnamed as does the original elven Mysticon Striker.
We learn a little about Zarya Moonwolf's troubled childhood, three years before becoming a Mysticon; that she had was taken from her village along with her best friends Kitty and Kasey Boon.
A new top-level Astromancer is later introduced; an orphan named Proxima Starfall.
The Codex is combined into a larger, considerably more powerful spellbook. It is used to release Queen Necrafa from her thousand-year imprisonment, who then drains its dry of its supremely powerful magic. 
Princess Arkayna discovers that she has a long-lost fraternal twin sister, but that they had to be separated due to a prophecy foretelling imminent annihilation for the mystical world of Gemina. Their birth father had tragically perished before they were born, defending the realm from an unknown evil.

Season 2 (2018)
Piper Willowbrook inadvertently is sent to an alternate reality.
Orphaned top Astromancer, Proxima Starfall, is revealed to have been nothing but a decoy to protect the identity of the younger Princes Twin of Gemina, Zarya Moonwolf.
Thoroughly heartbroken and feeling deserted and betrayed by her "twin sister" Princess Arkayna, Proxima has donned half of the evil mask worn by Queen Necrafa, allowing its ancient evil powers to consume her feelings of further loneliness and abandonment on her path of vengeance on the Mysticons. 
The all-powerful Dragon Disk has drained of all of its ancient mystical powers since Queen Necrafa had thoroughly drained the completed Codex after her release
Evil counterparts of the Mysticons are created: the Vexicons- Mallory, Kasha, Willa and Eartha. They also have an animal sidekick; a turquoise female fox called Deeva.
The ancient and mighty Dragons of Light are revealed to not be extinct after all, as an infant storm dragon called "Stormy" is discovered by the Mysticons and leaves with the Panhandler, who is revealed to be the supposedly deceased King Valmauk himself.
Dreadbane undoes the spell he himself had cast on King Darius and Queen Goodfey many months ago.
Princess Arkayna finally reunites with her mother and introduces her to Zarya Moonwolf, the younger twin daughter she never knew she had. Her brief memories of her, however, are restored off-screen.
The Mysticons seemed to have chosen the unnamed Dragons of Light as their animal companions over their longtime faithful griffins, as they were seen astride the dragons' in the final scene; it is unknown if they still have their mystical lightning Lances of Justice.
In the United States, episodes moved to Nicktoons as it debuted on January 13, 2018. A feature film is said to be in consideration.

Notes

References

Mysticons
Mysticons
Mysticons